Christopher Baillie (born 21 April 1981) is a Scottish hurdler from Old Kilpatrick, most noted for his silver medal at the 2006 Commonwealth Games in the 110 metre hurdles.

Early life
He was educated at Clydebank High School. He is the younger brother of the late Ross Baillie who was also a hurdler.

Career
Baillie won a gold medal in the 110-metre hurdles at the 1999 European Athletics Junior Championships in Riga, competing for Great Britain and finishing a dead heat with Spain's Felipe Vivancos. He won bronze at the 2001 European Athletics U23 Championships in Amsterdam.

Baillie now after retiring late in 2014 has taken up a more coaching side of things when it comes to athletics, basing himself in the West coast of Scotland at Scotstoun Stadium, home ground of his previous club Victoria Park Athletic.

References

 
gbrathletics

Scottish male hurdlers
Athletes (track and field) at the 2002 Commonwealth Games
Athletes (track and field) at the 2006 Commonwealth Games
Athletes (track and field) at the 2010 Commonwealth Games
Commonwealth Games silver medallists for Scotland
Commonwealth Games medallists in athletics
Team Bath track and field athletes
Sportspeople from Clydebank
People educated at Clydebank High School
Living people
1981 births
Medallists at the 2006 Commonwealth Games